Craig John Duby (born 20 February 1949), former Australian politician, was a member of the unicameral Legislative Assembly of the Australian Capital Territory between 1989 and 1992, elected to the multi-member single constituency Assembly as a representative of the No Self-Government Party. During his term in office, Duby was a member of the Independents Group and the Hare-Clark Independent Party. Duby was the Minister for Finance and Urban Services and briefly was the Minister for Housing and Community Services in the Kaine ministry. For part of one day, he served as the Leader of the Opposition.

Biography
Prior to entering politics, Duby worked as a real estate manager and public servant in the ACT Administration.

Duby was elected to the inaugural ACT Legislative Assembly in 1989 general election on a platform that was critical of the decision by the Australian Government to replace direct administration of the Territory with self-government. The anti-self-government movement carried significant popular weight; an advisory referendum held in 1978 concluded that only 30.5 per cent of electors were in favour of self-government; and Duby plus two other members of his No Self Government Party and a representative of the Abolish Self-Government Coalition were elected to the inaugural 17-member Assembly. However, once elected, reversal of the move to self-government proved impractical. Duby resigned from the No Self-Government Party, along with Carmel Maher and David Prowse, to form the Independents Group on 3 December 1989. Duby left the Independents Group to found the Hare-Clark Independent Party on 19 November 1991.

Duby served as Minister for Finance and Urban Services in the first Kaine ministry. In 1989 and 1990, he was convicted of two offences of driving under the influence, during the period when he was the minister with responsibility for road safety. A censure motion was moved against Duby in the Assembly; resolved in the negative:

As Minister for Finance and Urban Services one of his more notable achievements was the construction of a cover for the Canberra Olympic Swimming Pool permitting its year-round use, dubbed the "Duby dome". Commenting on the Duby dome in 1996, Liberal leader Gary Humphries said:

In the last days of the Kaine ministry, Duby served as Minister for Housing and Community Services; and then, for part of one day, as Leader of the Opposition.

References

Members of the Australian Capital Territory Legislative Assembly
1949 births
Living people
Leaders of the Opposition in the Australian Capital Territory
No Self-Government Party members of the Australian Capital Territory Legislative Assembly
Independents Group members of the Australian Capital Territory Legislative Assembly
Hare-Clark Independent Party members of the Australian Capital Territory Legislative Assembly